A freezer is a device similar to a refrigerator that maintains a temperature below the freezing point of water.

Freezer may also refer to:
Ice cream freezer or ice cream maker
Freezer (Pokémon) or Articuno, a character in Pokémon media
Freezer (Dragon Ball) or Frieza, a character in Dragon Ball media
Freezer (computer cooling), a series of CPU heatsink coolers from ARCTIC
"Freezer", a song by Band-Maid from the 2015 album New Beginning
 Freezer (film), a 2014 American thriller film

People named Freezer 
 C. J. Freezer (1924–2009), editor of Railway Modeller magazine
 Freezer Thompson, a professional wrestler from the United States Wrestling Association

See also
Freeze (disambiguation)